Bob Smalhout (13 October 1927 – 2 July 2015) was a Dutch physician, professor and author. Smalhout, an anesthesiologist, worked at the Utrecht Academic Hospital and the Utrecht University. Smalhout was the Lijsttrekker (top candidate) for the Pim Fortuyn List (LPF) party for the Dutch Senate election of 2003. Smalhout was the son of Elias Smalhout and came from a Reform Judaism family.

References

External links

  Dr. B. (Bob) Smalhout Parlement & Politiek

1927 births
2015 deaths
Dutch anesthesiologists
Dutch medical writers
Dutch columnists
Dutch essayists
Dutch television presenters
Dutch educators
Royal Netherlands Army officers
Pim Fortuyn List politicians
21st-century Dutch politicians
University of Amsterdam alumni
Academic staff of Utrecht University
Ohio State University faculty
Academic staff of the University of Antwerp
Academic staff of the University of Tübingen
Academic staff of Peking University
Dutch Jews
Jewish scientists
Physicians from Amsterdam
People from Zeist
Deaths from kidney failure